Toronto Transit Commission fleet could refer to one of several fleets of public transport vehicles used by the Toronto Transit Commission (TTC):
 
 , the fleet of the TTC's paratransit service
 Toronto streetcar system rolling stock
 Toronto subway rolling stock